Basketbalvereniging Herly Amsterdam was a Dutch professional basketball club based in Amsterdam.

History
Herly Amsterdam participated in DBL in the 1945–66 seasons. The club won its first champions title in 1966. The next year Herly participated in the FIBA European Champions Cup and reached to second round where it eliminated by AŠK Olimpija with aggregate score 156–159 (74–72 win in Amsterdam and 82–87 defeat in Ljubljana).

Honours & achievements
Dutch League
 Winners (1): 1965–66

References

Defunct basketball teams in the Netherlands
Former Dutch Basketball League teams
Sports clubs in Amsterdam